Sampie Mastriet (born 3 August 1990) is a South African professional rugby union player, who most recently played with the  in the domestic Currie Cup competition. His usual position is wing.

Career

He made his first team debut for the Blue Bulls in the 2011 Vodacom Cup against his former team .

In 2013, he was included in the squad for the 2013 Rugby World Cup Sevens.

References

South African rugby union players
Living people
1990 births
Bulls (rugby union) players
Blue Bulls players
Rugby union wings
South Africa international rugby sevens players
South Africa Under-20 international rugby union players